Andrzej Sołtan-Pereświat (30 November 1906 – 4 September 1939) was a Polish rower. He competed in the men's eight event at the 1928 Summer Olympics. He was killed in action during World War II.

References

External links
 

1906 births
1939 deaths
Polish male rowers
Olympic rowers of Poland
Rowers at the 1928 Summer Olympics
Sportspeople from Kyiv
People from Kievsky Uyezd
People from the Russian Empire of Polish descent
Polish military personnel killed in World War II
Deaths by airstrike during World War II